DWS can refer to:

 Dallas Wind Symphony, a professional concert band
 Dancing with the Stars, international reality TV franchise
 Dandy–Walker syndrome, a congenital brain malformation
 Data Warehouse System Electronic Surveillance Data Management System, an electronic FBI database
 Davis Waldorf School, a private Waldorf school located in Davis, California
 Debbie Wasserman Schultz, American politician, former chairperson of Democratic National Committee, member of the U.S. House of Representatives from Florida
 The Decline of Western Civilization, 1981 American documentary
 Deep-water soloing, a style of climbing
 Denton Wilde Sapte, an international law firm
 Dictionary writing system
 Diffusing-wave spectroscopy, a physics method for solutions
 Diplomatic wireless service
 Door Wilskracht Sterk, a Dutch football club
 Drinking water standard
 dws, 639-3 code for the Dutton Speedwords
 .dws, a drawing standard file for AutoCAD
 DWS Group, German asset management company
 Dynamic WAN Selection, a computer network routing technology